Novki is a rural locality (a settlement) in Bryzgalovskoye Rural Settlement, Kameshkovsky District, Vladimir Oblast, Russia. The population was 1,616 as of 2010. There are 23 streets.

Geography 
Novki is located 5 km east of Kameshkovo (the district's administrative centre) by road. Druzhba is the nearest rural locality.

References 

Rural localities in Kameshkovsky District